Antonio Bazzini (11 March 181810 February 1897) was an Italian violinist, composer and teacher. As a composer, his most enduring work is his chamber music, which earned him a central place in the Italian instrumental renaissance of the 19th century. However, his success as a composer was overshadowed by his reputation as one of the finest concert violinists of the nineteenth century. He also contributed to a portion of Messa per Rossini, specifically the first section of II. Sequentia, Dies Irae.

Biography

Bazzini was born at Brescia. As a young boy, he was a pupil of a local violinist . At 17, he was appointed organist of a church in his native town. The following year, he met Paganini and became completely influenced by that master's art and style. Paganini encouraged Bazzini to begin his concert career that year, and he quickly became one of the most highly regarded artists of his time. From 1841 to 1845 he lived in Germany, where he was much admired by Schumann both as a violinist and a composer, as well as by Mendelssohn (Bazzini gave the first private performance of his Violin Concerto).  After a short stay in Denmark in 1845, Bazzini returned to Brescia to teach and compose. In 1846, he played in Naples and Palermo. In 1849–1850 he toured Spain and from 1852 to 1863 lived in Paris. He ended his concert career with a tour of the Netherlands in 1864.

Returning once more to Brescia, Bazzini devoted himself to composition, gradually abandoning the virtuoso opera fantasias and character-pieces, which had formed a large part of his earlier work. Bazzini also produced a number of dramatic cantatas, sacred works, concert overtures, and symphonic poems over the next two decades. However, his greatest success as a composer was with his chamber music compositions. In 1868, he became president of the Società dei Concerti in Brescia, and was active in promoting and composing for quartet societies in Italy. In 1873, he became composition professor at the Milan Conservatory, where he taught Catalani, Mascagni, and Puccini, and later became the director in 1882. Bazzini died in Milan on 10 February 1897.

Music

Bazzini was one of the most highly regarded artists of his time and influenced the great opera composer Giacomo Puccini. His most enduring work is his chamber music, which is written in the classic forms of the German school and has earned him a central place in the Italian instrumental renaissance of the 19th century. Of particular note is his String Quartet No. 1, which won the Milan Quartet Society's first prize in 1864. His music is characterized by a highly virtuosic technique that is expressive without too much sentiment. Bazzini played a violin by Giuseppe Guarneri, which after his death passed to Marie Soldat-Roeger.

Artists who have recorded his music include Chloë Hanslip. However, many other violinists recorded the fiendishly difficult La Ronde des Lutins (trans. Dance of the Goblins) which includes extended passages of rapid double stops, artificial harmonics in double stops (using all four left fingers) and left-hand pizzicato. These include Bronislaw Huberman, Jascha Heifetz, Yehudi Menuhin, David Garrett, James Ehnes, and Itzhak Perlman.

Selected works

Chamber music
 The Dance of the Goblins (La Ronde des Lutins), Scherzo fantastique, Op. 25 (1852)
 String Quartet No. 1 in C major, WoO, (1864)
 String Quartet No. 2 in D minor, Op. 75 (1877)
 String Quartet No. 3 in E flat major, Op. 76 (1878)
 String Quartet No. 4 in G major, Op. 79 (1888)
 String Quartet No. 5 in C minor, Op. 80 (1891)
 String Quartet No. 6 in F major, Op. 82 (1892)
 String Quintet in A major for 2 violins, viola and 2 cellos, WoO. (1866)

Orchestral works
 Violin Concerto No.4 in A minor, Op.38
 Violin Concerto No.5 Militaire, Op.42
 Re Lear, Overture, Op.68
 Francesca da Rimini, Symphonic Poem, Op.77 (Berlin, 1889/90)

Operas

 Il silfo e l'innamorato, (Milan, 1865)
 Turanda (Milan, La Scala, 13 January 1867)

Sources
Ballola, Giovanni Carli & Marvin, Roberta Montemorra: "Antonio Bazzini." Grove Music Online, ed. L. Macy. (Accessed 12 March 2018. Subscription access.)

References

External links

Antonio Bazzini – String Quartet Nos. 1, 3 & 5, sound-bites and short biography.

1818 births
1897 deaths
19th-century classical composers
19th-century classical violinists
19th-century Italian male musicians
Chamber virtuosi of the Emperor of Austria
Italian classical composers
Italian classical violinists
Italian male classical composers
Italian opera composers
Italian Romantic composers
Male classical violinists
Male opera composers
Academic staff of Milan Conservatory
Musicians from Brescia
String quartet composers